The International Innovation Index is a global index measuring the level of innovation of a country, produced jointly by The Boston Consulting Group (BCG), the National Association of Manufacturers (NAM), and The Manufacturing Institute (MI), the NAM's nonpartisan research affiliate. NAM describes it as the "largest and most comprehensive global index of its kind".

The International Innovation Index is part of a large research study that looked at both the business outcomes of innovation and government's ability to encourage and support innovation through public policy. The study comprised a survey of more than 1,000 senior executives from NAM member companies across all industries; in-depth interviews with 30 of the executives; and a comparison of the "innovation friendliness" of 110 countries and all 50 U.S. states. The findings are published in the report, "The Innovation Imperative in Manufacturing: How the United States Can Restore Its Edge."

The report discusses not only country performance but also what companies are doing and should be doing to spur innovation. It looks at new policy indicators for innovation, including tax incentives and policies for immigration, education and intellectual property.

Large country ranking 
The index was published in March 2009. To rank the countries, the study measured both innovation inputs and outputs. Innovation inputs included government and fiscal policy, education policy and the innovation environment. Outputs included patents, technology transfer, and other R&D results; business performance, such as labor productivity and total shareholder returns; and the impact of innovation on business migration and economic growth. The following is a list of the twenty largest countries (as measured by GDP) by the International Innovation Index:

Large and small country ranking

See also

 Global Innovation Index
 Bloomberg Innovation Quotient
 Creative destruction
 Creative problem solving
 Theories of technology
 Diffusion (anthropology)
 Ecoinnovation
 Emerging technologies
 List of emerging technologies
 Hype cycle
 Individual capital
 Induced innovation
 Information revolution
 Innovation economics
 Knowledge economy
 Open innovation
 Timeline of historic inventions
 Toolkits for user innovation
 User innovation
 Value network

References

External links 
 The Boston Consulting Group
 National Association of Manufacturers

Global economic indicators
Innovation